Tillabéri  is a department of the Tillabéri Region in Niger. Its capital lies at the city of Tillabéri, and contains the Communes of Ayorou (as of 2001 the largest town in Department), Anzourou, Dessa, Kourteye, and Sinder.  Tillabéri is also the capital of Tillabéri Region. The western border of the department is formed by the Niger River. As of 2011, the department had a total population of 295,898 people.

References

Portions of this article were translated from the French language Wikipedia articles :fr:Tillabéri (région), 2008-06-19.

Departments of Niger
Tillabéri Region